The sudden demise of M.G. Ramachandran  24 December 1987, the Council of  Ministers headed by him  was dissolved. The Governor appointed V.R. Nedunchezhiyan Senior Most Member of the outgoing Council to act as Chief Minister till the election  of  new Leader and on his advice appointed Council of Ministers.

Cabinet ministers

References 

All India Anna Dravida Munnetra Kazhagam
Tamil Nadu ministries
1980s in Tamil Nadu
1987 establishments in Tamil Nadu
1988 disestablishments in India
Cabinets established in 1987
Cabinets disestablished in 1988